Connector may refer to:

Hardware
Plumbing
 Electrical connector, a device for joining electrical circuits together (sometimes known as ports, plugs, or interfaces)
 Gender of connectors and fasteners
 AC power plugs and sockets, devices that allow electrically operated equipment to be connected to the primary alternating current power supply in a building
 RF connector, an electrical connector designed to work at radio frequencies in the multi-megahertz range
 Circular connector
 Cigarette lighter receptacle
 Blind mate connector, a connector with self-aligning features
 Board-to-board connector, for connecting printed circuit boards
 Optical fiber connector, for joining optical fibers in communication systems
 Phone connector (disambiguation)
 Structural connector, in engineering

Software
 Connector (computer science), a pointer or link between two data structures
 Data connector, generic term for software which allows loading of data from one place to another, e.g. databases, file systems or events
 Database connector, software which allows client software to talk to database server
 Java EE Connector Architecture, a Java-based tool for connecting application servers and enterprise information systems

Other uses
 Connector (mathematics), a mathematical mapping
 Connector (road), a highway or freeway road that connects to another highway or freeway
Northern Connector, highway in Australia 
 Connector (social), people who help others by connecting them together
 Connector (Cincinnati), streetcar system in Cincinnati, Ohio
 Connector (I the Mighty album), by rock band I the Mighty
 A free bus on there Adelaide Metro, South Australia

See also
 The Connector (disambiguation)